John Kobina Abbam Aboah Sanie (born 10 August 1971) is a Ghanaian politician and member of the New Patriotic Party. He is the member of parliament for the Mpohor Constituency, in the Western Region of Ghana

Early life and education 
Aboah Sanie hails from Mpohor. He holds a Bsc In Entrepreneurship

Personal life 
Sanie is a Christian.

References 

New Patriotic Party politicians
Living people
Ghanaian MPs 2021–2025
People from Western Region (Ghana)
1971 births